The Polish Academy Award for Best Producer was an annual award (1999–2001) given to the best Polish film producer of the year.

Winners and nominees

External links
 Polish Film Awards; Official website 

Polish film awards
Awards established in 1999
Awards disestablished in 2001
1999 establishments in Poland